Remedy is the fourth full-length studio album and seventh overall by David Crowder Band, released on September 25, 2007 through sixstepsrecords. A limited edition of the album including a bonus DVD of live performances was released on April 29, 2008.

Recording process
David Crowder Band began recording on March 19, and chronicled the process through three avenues: David Crowder's Xanga Blog, daily YouTube videos, and an array of live webcams that could be viewed at remedyiscoming.com. The band finished recording on April 14.

Critical reception

Remedy garnered critical acclaim from music critics. At CCM Magazine, Andy Argyrakis gave it four-and-a-half stars feeling that the release is "sure to resound with power no matter what the pace." Mike Rimmer of Cross Rhythms gave it nine-out-of-ten squares noting that the album "sees Crowder simplify things and deliver his most accessible album in years." At Christianity Today, Russ Breimeier gave it four-and-a-half stars stating that "When the music is this good, worship comes naturally", which he affirmed the music on this album does. Jared Johnson of Allmusic gave it four-and-a-half stars affirming that "It was obvious prior to Remedy that Crowder approaches praise & worship projects from a different realm in the sonic universe."

At Christian Broadcasting Network, Jennifer E. Jones gave it four-and-a-half spins writing that the music is more "concise" making Remedy "a quick shot in the arm full of everything you love about DCB" because the release contains "Futuristic worship and a heart that's bleeding for a Savior to come are the crowning achievements of this album." David Taylor of Jesus Freak Hideout gave it four-and-a-half stars claiming that "the most consistent from start to finish", and it was for "Those looking for a fresh, original, and accessible new worship album should look no further than Remedy." At New Release Tuesday, Kevin Davis gave it four-and-a-half stars commenting that "in another few months this will be my favorite."

Lindsay Whitfield of Soul Shine Magazine gave it four-and-a-half stars proclaiming that "It amazes me to hear how David Crowder Band brings simplicity and uniqueness to every song they compose and work with, especially the finely crafted title track 'The Remedy'." At The Christian Manifesto, Calvin E'Jon Moore gave it four stars saying that the release is "well worth multiple listens, well worth the money, and well worth the wait." Noah Salo of The Phantom Tollbooth rated it three-and-a-half stars writing that the effort was almost an "instant classic" however compared to A Collision it was not, but "If you are a diehard then you will want this, but if you're a newbie stick with A Collision, it is a much richer experience."

However, Dan MacIntosh of antiMusic gave it just three stars stating that the listener "may not consider Crowder's spiritual Remedy doctor's orders, but when he suggests, 'Where there is pain/Let there be grace,' it is impossible to argue with logic like that [...] whether you happen to share his theology or not." At Patrol Magazine, David Sessions gave it a five-point seven out of ten cautioning that the release is "so wedded to the humdrum contemporary-worship form that one can hardly help responding with the same apathy."

Track listing

 "Everything Glorious" was featured on a live album recorded at Passion Conferences' Passion06 conference in Nashville, TN in January 2006.
 "Glory of It All" was featured on a digital-only EP recorded live at Passion Conferences' Passion07 conference in Atlanta, GA in January 2007.
 "We Won't Be Quiet" features Ted Nugent, a fellow Waco resident, on lead guitar.
 "Rain Down" was previously featured on the band's independent release, All I Can Say.

Limited edition 

11. "Never Let Go (Radio Remix)" - 4:41

Personnel

 David Crowder – lead and backing vocals, acoustic guitar
 Jack Parker – electric guitar, backing vocals
 Mark Waldrop – electric guitar, backing vocals
 Mike Dodson – bass, piano
 Mike Hogan – violin, turntables
 B-Wack – drums, percussion, programming
 Taylor Johnson - electric guitar

Charts
Remedy sold over 32,000 copies in its first week and ranked the positions below in various charts.

Singles

Awards

In 2008, the album won two Dove Awards: Praise & Worship Album of the Year and Recorded Music Packaging of the Year at the 39th GMA Dove Awards. It was also nominated for Rock/Contemporary Album of the Year.

References

External links
Official preview site
CCM Patrol Review: David Crowder Band, Remedy

David Crowder Band albums